KKR & Co. Inc., also known as Kohlberg Kravis Roberts & Co., is an American global investment company that manages multiple alternative asset classes, including private equity, energy, infrastructure, real estate, credit, and, through its strategic partners, hedge funds. , the firm had completed more than 690 private equity investments in portfolio companies with approximately $700 billion of total enterprise value. , assets under management (AUM) and fee paying assets under management (FPAUM) were $504 billion and $412 billion, respectively.

The firm was founded in 1976 by Jerome Kohlberg Jr., and cousins Henry Kravis and George R. Roberts, all of whom had previously worked together at Bear Stearns, where they completed some of the earliest leveraged buyout transactions. Since its founding, KKR has completed a number of transactions, including the 1989 leveraged buyout of RJR Nabisco, which was the largest buyout in history to that point, as well as the 2007 buyout of TXU, which is currently the largest buyout completed to date.

In October 2009, KKR listed shares in the company through KKR & Co., an affiliate that holds 30% of the firm's ownership equity, with the remainder held by the firm's partners. In March 2010, KKR filed to list its shares on the New York Stock Exchange (NYSE), with trading commencing four months later, on July 15, 2010.

 KKR had offices in 21 cities in 16 countries across five continents. The firm was headquartered in the Solow Building (9 West 57th Street, New York, New York), but in October 2015, announced its intention to occupy the newly-constructed 30 Hudson Yards.

The firm
KKR is led by its executive leadership team, Henry Kravis, George R. Roberts, Joseph Bae, and Scott C. Nuttall. The firm employs approximately 375 investment professionals and 1,250 total employees as of December 31, 2017. KKR is headquartered at 30 Hudson Yards, Manhattan, New York, with offices in Menlo Park and San Francisco (California), Houston (Texas), London, Dublin, Paris, Madrid, Luxembourg, Hong Kong, Tokyo, Beijing, Shanghai, Mumbai, Dubai, Riyadh, Seoul, São Paulo, Singapore, and Sydney.

Senior leadership 

 Chairmen: Henry Kravis and George Roberts (since 1987)
 Chief Executives: Scott Nuttall and Joseph Bae (since 2021)

List of former chairmen 

 Jerome Kohlberg Jr. (1976–1987); co-chairmen

List of former CEOs 

 Henry Kravis, George Roberts, and Jerome Kohlberg Jr. (1976–1987); co-CEOs
 Henry Kravis and George Roberts (1987–2021); co-CEOs

Business structure 
In a 2016 interview with Bloomberg, founder Henry Kravis described KKR in terms of three broad buckets: private markets, public markets, and capital markets. The firm has traditionally specialized in private equity investments, focusing on specific industry sectors where the firm has created dedicated investment groups, including:

Business segments

KKR's business operates in four segments: private markets, public markets, capital markets, and principal activities.

Through its private markets segment, the firm manages and sponsors a group of private equity funds that invest capital for long-term appreciation, either through controlling ownership of a company or strategic minority positions. In addition to traditional private equity funds, KKR sponsors investment funds that invest in growth equity and core equity. The firm also manages and sponsors investment funds that invest capital in real assets, such as infrastructure, energy, and real estate.

Private markets
KKR has raised 23 private and growth equity funds with approximately $102.9 billion of capital commitments through December 31, 2017. Its private equity investment strategy typically seeks to engage primarily in management buyouts, build-ups, or other investments with a view to acquiring a controlling or significant influence. The firm has sourced several smaller growth equity investments and expanded the business by launching dedicated growth equity funds.

KKR's first dedicated growth equity fund, launched in 2016, invests in the technology, media, and telecommunications sector, primarily in the United States, Canada, Europe, and Israel. In 2016, KKR also launched its second dedicated growth equity fund to pursue investments in the health care sector, also primarily in the United States. As of December 31, 2017, they have received $2.0 billion of capital commitments to these strategies.

In 2017, they further expanded on their private equity business by making their first core equity investment, targeting investments that have a longer holding period and a lower risk profile.

Energy

KKR's energy business aims to deliver current returns to fund investors through distributions generated by producing and selling oil and natural gas reserves and capital appreciation and targets real asset investments across the upstream and midstream segments of the oil and gas industry. KKR invests in these energy strategies primarily through the KKR Energy Income and Growth Fund. As of December 31, 2017, they have received $2.9 billion of capital commitments to their energy funds and $1.0 billion of capital commitments to this strategy through separately managed accounts.

Infrastructure

KKR's infrastructure platform seeks to achieve returns including current income through the acquisition and operational improvement of assets important to the functioning of the economy. The platform has made investments in parking, alternative energy, district heating and contracted electricity generation, water, and wastewater, locomotive transportation, midstream, and telecommunications infrastructure. As of December 31, 2017, KKR had received $4.1 billion of capital commitments to its infrastructure funds and $1.1 billion of capital commitments to this strategy through separately managed accounts and co-investment vehicles.

Real Estate

KKR's real estate platform targets real estate equity primarily in the United States and Western Europe. The firm's equity investments include direct investments in real property, debt, special situations transactions, and businesses with significant real estate holdings. As of December 31, 2017, KKR has received $3.9 billion of capital commitments through its real estate equity investment funds.

KKR's real estate credit platform provides capital services for complex real estate transactions with a focus on commercial mortgage-backed securities, whole loans, and subordinated debt. As of December 31, 2017, KKR managed approximately $2.2 billion of assets in its real estate credit strategy, which includes KKR Real Estate Finance Trust Inc. ("KREF"), an NYSE-listed real estate investment trust ("REIT"), and $1.1 billion of capital commitments through a real estate credit fund.

Public markets

Credit

KKR's credit business invests capital in leveraged credit strategies, including leveraged loans, high-yield bonds, opportunistic credit and revolving credit strategies, and alternative credit strategies, including special situations and private credit strategies such as direct lending and private opportunistic credit (or mezzanine) investment strategies.

Hedge Funds

KKR's hedge fund business consists of strategic manager partnerships with third-party hedge fund managers in which KKR owns a minority stake. As of December 31, 2017, the strategic manager partnerships with third-party hedge fund managers accounted for $26.2 billion of AUM.

BDCs

In December 2017, FS Investments and KKR announced they are pooling together more than $18 billion in private capital to invest in mid-sized businesses, in a push to do bigger deals which are out of reach for other alternative lenders.

Capital markets
KKR's capital markets business mainly arranges debt and equity transactions for the firm, its portfolio companies, and third parties. KKR's capital markets group raised $815 million of debt needed to close the purchase of Mills Fleet Farm in 2016.

Principal activities
The Principal Activities segment uses KKR's balance sheet assets to support its investment management and capital markets businesses. KKR uses this capital for general partner commitments and to establish a track record for fundraising purposes in new strategies, such as the approximately $1 billion invested in KKR's real estate business as of 2017.

History

Founding and early history
While running the corporate finance department for Bear Stearns in the 1960s and 1970s, Jerome Kohlberg, and later Henry Kravis and George Roberts, completed a series of what they described as "bootstrap" investments. They targeted family-owned businesses, many of which had been founded in the years following World War II, that were facing succession issues. Many of these companies lacked a viable exit for their founders because they were too small to be taken public and the founders were reluctant to sell out to competitors.

In 1964, Lewis Cullman acquired and then sold Orkin Exterminating Company in what some call the first significant leveraged buyout transaction. In the following years the three Bear Stearns bankers completed a series of buyouts including Stern Metals (1965), Incom (a division of Rockwood International, 1971), Cobblers Industries (1971), and Boren Clay (1973), as well as Thompson Wire, Eagle Motors and Barrows through their investment in Stern Metals. Despite a number of highly successful investments, the $27 million investment in Cobblers ended in bankruptcy.

By 1976, tensions had built up between Bear Stearns and Kohlberg, Kravis and Roberts, which led to the formation of Kohlberg Kravis Roberts & Co.  The name had been going to be Kohlberg Roberts Kravis, but public relations advisors preferred the sound of KKR.  Most notably, Bear Stearns executive Cy Lewis had rejected repeated proposals to form a dedicated investment fund within Bear Stearns.

The new KKR completed its first buyout, of manufacturer A.J. Industries, in 1976. KKR raised capital from a small group of investors including the Hillman Company and First Chicago Bank. By 1978, with the revision of the ERISA regulations, the nascent KKR was successful in raising its first institutional fund with over $30 million of investor commitments. In 1981, KKR expanded its investor base after the Oregon State Treasury's public pension fund invested in KKR's acquisition of retailer Fred Meyer, Inc. Oregon State remains an active investor in KKR funds.

In 1979 KKR completed a risky, precedent-setting ($380 million) public-to-private leveraged buyout of a large conglomerate Houdaille Industries, a well-known producer of machine tools, industrial pipes, chrome-plated car bumpers and torsional viscous dampers, which they signed the previous year. It soon ended in a spectacular failure, breakup of the half-a-century-old company and loss of thousands of jobs, even though creditors earned a profit.

Among the firm's acquisitions during the 1980s buyout boom were:

Buyout of RJR Nabisco

At age 61, Kohlberg resigned in 1987 (he later founded his own private equity firm, Kohlberg & Co.), and Henry Kravis succeeded him as senior partner. Under Kravis and Roberts, the firm was responsible for the 1988 leveraged buyout of RJR Nabisco. RJR Nabisco was the largest buyout in history at that time, at $25 billion, and remained the largest buyout for the next 17 years. The deal was chronicled in Barbarians at the Gate: The Fall of RJR Nabisco, and later made into a television movie starring James Garner.

In 1988, F. Ross Johnson was the president and CEO of RJR Nabisco, the company formed in 1985 by the merger of Nabisco Brands and R.J. Reynolds Tobacco Company, a leading producer of food products. In October of that year, Johnson proposed a $17 billion ($75 per share) management buyout of the company with the financial backing of investment bank Shearson Lehman Hutton and its parent company, American Express.

Several days later, Kravis, who had originally suggested the idea of the buyout to Johnson, presented a new bid for $20.3 billion ($90 per share) financed with an aggressive debt package. KKR had the support of equity co-investments from pension funds and other institutional investors. Investors included Coca-Cola, Georgia-Pacific and United Technologies corporate pension funds, as well as endowments from MIT, Harvard and the New York State Common Retirement Fund However, KKR faced criticism from existing investors over the firm's use of hostile tactics in the buyout of RJR.

KKR proposed to provide a joint offer with Johnson and Shearson Lehman but was rebuffed and Johnson attempted to stonewall KKR's access to financial information from RJR. Rival private equity firm Forstmann Little & Co. was invited into the process by Shearson Lehman but attempted to provide a bid for RJR with a consortium of Goldman Sachs Capital Partners, Procter & Gamble, Ralston Purina and Castle & Cooke.

Ultimately the Forstmann consortium came apart and did not provide a final bid for RJR.

In November 1988, RJR set guidelines for a final bid submission at the end of the month. The management and Shearson group submitted a final bid of $112, a figure they felt certain would enable them to outflank any response by Kravis and KKR. KKR's final bid of $109, while a lower dollar figure, was ultimately accepted by the board of directors of RJR Nabisco. KKR's offer was guaranteed, whereas the management offer lacked a "reset", meaning that the final share price might have been lower than their stated $112 per share.

Additionally, many in RJR's board of directors had grown concerned at recent disclosures of Ross Johnson's unprecedented golden parachute deal. Time magazine featured Johnson on the cover of their December 1988 issue along with the headline, "A Game of Greed: This man could pocket $100 million from the largest corporate takeover in history. Has the buyout craze gone too far?". KKR's offer was welcomed by the board, and, to some observers, it appeared that their elevation of the reset issue as a deal-breaker in KKR's favor was little more than an excuse to reject Johnson's higher bid of $112 per share. Johnson received $53 million from the buyout. KKR collected a $75 million fee in the RJR takeover. At $31.1 billion of а transaction value (including assumed debt), RJR Nabisco was, at the time, by far the largest leveraged buyout in history.

In 2006 and 2007, a number of leveraged buyout transactions were completed which surpassed the RJR Nabisco leveraged buyout in terms of the nominal purchase price. The deal was first surpassed in July 2006 by the $33 billion buyout of U.S. hospital operator Hospital Corporation of America, in which KKR participated. However, adjusted for inflation, none of the leveraged buyouts of the 2006–07 period would surpass RJR Nabisco.

Early 1990s: The aftermath of RJR Nabisco
The buyout of RJR Nabisco was completed in April 1989 and KKR would spend the early 1990s repaying the RJR's enormous debt load through a series of asset sales and restructuring transactions. KKR did not complete a single investment in 1990, the first such year since 1982. KKR began to focus primarily on its existing portfolio companies acquired during the buyout boom of the late 1980s. Six of KKR's portfolio companies completed IPOs in 1991, including RJR Nabisco and Duracell.

As the new decade began, KKR began restructuring RJR. In January 1990, it completed the sale of RJR's Del Monte Foods to a group led by Merrill Lynch. KKR had originally identified a group of divisions that it could sell to reduce debt. Over the coming years, RJR would pursue a number of additional restructurings, equity injections, and public offerings of stock to provide the company with added financial flexibility. KKR contributed $1.7 billion of new equity into RJR in July 1990 to complete a restructuring of the company's balance sheet. KKR's equity contribution as part of the original leveraged buyout of RJR had been only $1.5 billion. In mid-December 1990, RJR announced an exchange offer that would swap debt in RJR for a new public stock in the company, effectively an unusual means of taking RJR public again and simultaneously reducing debt on the company.

RJR issued additional stock to the public in March 1991 to further reduce debt, resulting in an upgrade of the credit rating of RJR's debt from junk to investment grade. KKR began to reduce its ownership in RJR in 1994, when its stock in RJR was used as part of the consideration for its leveraged buyout of Borden, Inc., a producer of food and beverage products, consumer products, and industrial products.
 The following year, in 1995, KKR would divest itself of its final stake in RJR Nabisco when Borden sold a $638 million block of stock.

While KKR no longer had any ownership of RJR Nabisco by 1995, its original investment would not be fully realized until KKR exited its last investment in 2004. After sixteen years of efforts, including contributing new equity, taking RJR public, asset sales, and exchanging shares of RJR for the ownership of Borden, Inc., KKR finally sold the last remnants of its 1989 investment. In July 2004, KKR agreed to sell its stock in Borden Chemical to Apollo Management for $1.2 billion.

Early 1990s: Investments
In the early 1990s, the absence of an active high yield market prompted KKR to change its tactics, avoiding large leveraged buyouts in favor of industry consolidations through what was described as leveraged buildups or rollups. One of KKR's largest investments in the 1990s was the leveraged buildup of Primedia in partnership with former executives of Macmillan Publishing, which KKR had failed to acquire in 1988. KKR created Primedia's predecessor, K-III Communications, a platform to buy media properties, initially completing the $310 million divisional buyout of the book club division of Macmillan along with the assets of Intertec Publishing Corporation in May 1989.

During the early 1990s, K-III continued acquiring publishing assets, including a $650 million acquisition from News Corporation in 1991. K-III went public, however instead of cashing out, KKR continued to make new investments in the company in 1998, 2000 and 2001 to support acquisition activity. In 2005, Primedia redeemed KKR's preferred stock in the company but KKR was estimated to have lost hundreds of millions of dollars on its common stock holdings as the price of the company's stock collapsed.

In 1991, KKR partnered with Fleet/Norstar Financial Group in the 1991 acquisition of the Bank of New England, from the US Federal Deposit Insurance Corporation. In January 1996, KKR would exchange its investment for a 7.5% interest in Fleet Bank. KKR completed the 1992 buyout of American Re Corporation from Aetna as well as a 47% interest in TW Corporation, later known as The Flagstar Companies and owner of Denny's in 1992. Among the other notable investments KKR completed in the early 1990s included World Color Press (1993–95), RELTEC Corporation (1995) and Bruno's (1995).

1996–1999
By the mid-1990s, the debt markets were improving and KKR had moved on from the RJR Nabisco buyout. In 1996, KKR was able to complete the bulk of fundraising for what was then a record $6 billion private equity fund, the KKR 1996 Fund. However, KKR was still burdened by the performance of the RJR investment and repeated obituaries in the media. KKR was required by its investors to reduce the fees it charged and to calculate its carried interest based on the total profit of the fund (i.e., offsetting losses from failed deals against the profits from successful deals).

KKR's activity level would accelerate over the second half of the 1990s making a series of notable investments including Spalding Holdings Corporation and Evenflo (1996), Newsquest (1996), KinderCare Learning Centers (1997), Amphenol Corporation (1997), Randalls Food Markets (1997), The Boyds Collection (1998), MedCath Corporation (1998), Willis Group Holdings (1998), Smiths Group (1999), and Wincor Nixdorf (1999).

KKR's largest investment of the 1990s would be one of its least successful. In January 1998, KKR and Hicks, Muse, Tate & Furst agreed to the $1.5 billion buyouts of Regal Entertainment Group. KKR and Hicks Muse had initially intended to combine Regal with Act III Cinemas, which KKR had acquired in 1997 for $706 million and United Artists Theaters, which Hicks Muse had agreed to acquire for $840 million in November 1997. Shortly after agreeing to the Regal takeover, the deal with United Artists fell apart, destroying the strategy to eliminate costs by building a larger combined company. Two years later, in 2000, Regal encountered significant financial issues and was forced to file for bankruptcy protection; the company passed to billionaire investor Philip Anschutz.

2000–2005

At the start of the 21st century, the landscape of large leveraged buyout firms was changing. Several large and storied firms, including Hicks Muse Tate & Furst and Forstmann Little & Company were dragged down by heavy losses in the bursting of the telecom bubble. Although KKR's track record since RJR Nabisco was mixed, losses on such investments as Regal Entertainment Group, Spalding, Flagstar and Primedia (previously K-III Communications) were offset by successes in Willis Group, Wise Foods, Inc., Wincor Nixdorf and MTU Aero Engines, among others.

Additionally, KKR was one of the few firms that were able to complete large leveraged buyout transactions in the years immediately following the collapse of the Internet bubble, including Shoppers Drug Mart and Bell Canada Yellow Pages. KKR was able to realize its investment in Shoppers Drug Mart through a 2002 IPO and subsequent public stock offerings. The directories business would be taken public in 2004 as Yellow Pages Income Fund, a Canadian income trust.

In 2004 a consortium comprising KKR, Bain Capital and real estate development company Vornado Realty Trust announced the $6.6 billion acquisition of Toys "R" Us, the toy retailer. A month earlier, Cerberus Capital Management, made a $5.5 billion offer for both the toy and baby supplies businesses. The Toys 'R' Us buyout was one of the largest in several years. Following this transaction, by the end of 2004 and in 2005, major buyouts were once again becoming common and market observers were stunned by the leverage levels and financing terms obtained by financial sponsors in their buyouts.

In 2005, KKR was one of seven private equity firms involved in the buyout of SunGard in a transaction valued at $11.3 billion. KKR's partners in the acquisition were Silver Lake Partners, Bain Capital, Goldman Sachs Capital Partners, Blackstone Group, Providence Equity Partners, and TPG Capital. This represented the largest leveraged buyout completed since the takeover of RJR Nabisco in 1988. SunGard was the largest buyout of a technology company until the Blackstone-led buyout of Freescale Semiconductor. The SunGard transaction was notable given the number of firms involved in the transaction, the largest club deal completed to that point. The involvement of seven firms in the consortium was criticized by investors in private equity who considered cross-holdings among firms to be generally unattractive.

Since 2005 and the Buyout Boom
In 2006, KKR raised a new $17.6 billion fund the KKR 2006 Fund, with which the firm began executing a series of some of the largest buyouts in history. KKR's $44 billion takeover of Texas-based power utility TXU in 2007 proved to be the largest leveraged buyout of the mid-2000s buyout boom and the largest buyout completed to date. Among the most notable companies acquired by KKR in 2006 and 2007 were the following:

Other non-buyout investments completed by KKR during this period included Legg Mason, Sun Microsystems, Tarkett, Longview Power Plant, and Seven Network. In October 2006, KKR acquired a 50% stake in Tarkett, a France-based distributor of flooring products, in a deal valued at about €1.4 billion ($1.8 billion). On November 20, 2006, KKR announced it would form a A$4 billion partnership with the Seven Network of Australia. On January 23, 2007, KKR announced it would invest $700 million through a PIPE investment in Sun Microsystems. In January 2008, KKR announced it had made a $1.25 billion PIPE investment in Legg Mason through a convertible preferred stock offering.

In addition to its successful buyout transactions, KKR was involved in the failed buyout of Harman International Industries, an upscale audio equipment maker. On April 26, 2007, Harman announced it had entered an agreement to be acquired by KKR and Goldman Sachs. In September 2007, KKR and Goldman backed out of the $8 billion buyout of Harman. By the end of the day, Harman's shares had plummeted by more than 24% upon the news.

Initial public offering
In 2007, KKR filed with the Securities and Exchange Commission to raise $1.25 billion by selling an ownership interest in its management company. The filing came less than two weeks after the initial public offering of rival private equity firm Blackstone Group. KKR had previously listed its KPE vehicle in 2006, but for the first time, KKR would offer investors an ownership interest in the management company itself. The onset of the credit crunch and the shutdown of the IPO market dampened the prospects of obtaining a valuation attractive to KKR. The flotation was repeatedly postponed and called off by the end of August.

The following year, in July 2008, KKR announced a new plan to list its shares. The plan called for KKR to complete a reverse takeover of its listed affiliate KKR Private Equity Investors in exchange for a 21% interest in the firm. In November 2008, KKR announced a delay of this transaction until 2009. Shares of KPE had declined significantly in the second half of 2008 with the onset of the credit crunch. KKR has announced that it expects to close the transaction in 2009. In October 2009, KKR listed shares in KKR & Co. on the Euronext exchange, replacing KPE and anticipates a listing on the New York Stock Exchange in 2010. The public entity represents a 30% interest in Kohlberg Kravis Roberts. In October 2010, KKR acquired about nine members of Goldman Sachs Group proprietary trading team after entertaining offers from investment firms such as Perella Weinberg and Blackrock. With Goldman shutting down its proprietary trading operations, its executives, led by Bob Howard, will help KKR expand beyond leveraged buyouts into areas such as hedge funds.

2010–present
In December 2011, Samson Investment Company was acquired by a group of private equity investors led by KKR for approximately $7.2 billion and Samson Resources Corporation was formed. With the severe downturn in oil and natural gas prices, in September 2015, the Company went into Chapter 11 bankruptcy and during its bankruptcy process, sold several large assets.

In March 2013, KKR exited its joint venture in music company BMG Rights Management, selling its 51% stake to Bertelsmann.

In January 2014, KKR acquired Sedgwick Claims Management Services Inc for $2.4 billion from two private equity companies - Stone Point, and Hellman & Friedman. In June 2014, KKR announced it was taking a one-third stake in a Spanish energy business of Acciona Energy, at a cost of €417 million ($567 million). The international renewable energy generation business operates renewable assets, largely wind farms, across 14 countries including the United States, Italy and South Africa. In August 2014, KKR announced it was investing $400 million to acquire Fujian Sunner Development, China's largest chicken farmer, which breeds, processes and supplies frozen and fresh chickens to consumers and corporate clients, such as KFC and McDonald's, across China. In September 2014, the firm invested $90 million in a lighting and electrics firm Savant Systems.  Also in 2014, KKR acquired commercial landscaping company ValleyCrest from Michael Dell’s investment firm MSD Capital, and combined it with landscape company Brickman, which it had owned since 2013, to form BrightView.

In January 2015, KKR confirmed its purchase of the British rail ticket website thetrainline.com, previously owned by Exponent. The purchase sum is unknown. On October 12, 2015, KKR announced that it has entered into definitive agreement with Allianz Capital Partners to acquire their majority stake in Selecta Group, a European vending services operator.

In 2016, KKR purchased two Hispanic chains, Northern California Mi Pueblo and Ontario, California–based Cardenas. In February 2016, KKR invested $75 million in commercial real estate lender A10 Capital. On September 1, 2016, KKR announced that it had acquired Epicor Software Corporation, an American software company. In October 2016, it was reported that KKR invested $250 million in OVH to be used for further international expansion. This funding round valued OVH at over $1 billion, making it a unicorn. In December 2016, the Lonza Group announced it would acquire Capsugel for $5.5 billion from Kohlberg Kravis Roberts.

In February 2017, KKR was reported to be trying to take over the international market research company ARI GfK SE. In July 2017, KKR acquired WebMD Health Corp for $2.8 billion and, the following month, it acquired PharMerica for $1.4 billion including debt, Pepper Group for $518 million, Covenant Surgical Partners, and Envision Healthcare Corporations ambulance business for $2.4 billion. On July 6, 2017, KKR announced it would merge Northern California Mi Pueblo and Ontario-based Cardenas Market. On September 18, 2017, Toys "R" Us, Inc. filed for Chapter 11 bankruptcy, stating the move would give it flexibility to deal with $5 billion in long-term debt, borrow $2 billion so it can pay suppliers for the upcoming holiday season and invest in improving current operations.

During 2017, KKR purchased an 80 percent stake in Dixon Hospitality Group for $190 million (AUD) in 2017 which turned into the company Australian Venue Co. (AVC). Australian Venue Co. is a food and beverage-focused operator in the Australian hospitality industry with a portfolio of 200+ venues. 

In mid-July 2018, KKR purchased RBMedia, one of the largest independent publishers and distributors of audiobooks. On July 22, 2018, KKR & Co. announced it is taking over Taipei-based LCY Chemical Corp. in a deal valued at NT$47.8 billion ($1.56 billion US), part of a plan for more transactions involving controlling stakes in the Greater China region. In July 2018, it was announced that KKR sold Gallagher Shopping Park, West Midlands in the UK to South Korean investors, Hana for £175 million.

In February 2019, KKR acquired the German media company Tele München Gruppe. Later that month, KKR acquired German film distributor Universum Film GmbH. In July 2019, KKR acquired the Canadian software company Corel. In August 2019, KKR acquired Arnott's, the Australian snack unit of Campbell Soup Company, for $2.2 billion. Later that month, KKR became the biggest shareholder of German media group Axel Springer, paying $3.2 billion for a 43.54% stake.

In December 2019, KKR, together with Alberta Investment Management Corporation, acquired a 65% stake in the controversial Coastal GasLink pipeline project, from TC Energy. The pipeline route crosses the territory of the Wet'suwet'en Nation, which opposes the project. Enforcement of an injunction to build through the Wet'suwet'en territory has sparked widespread protests across Canada.

In the final days of 2019, KKR announced it would acquire OverDrive, Inc., a major distributor of eBooks to libraries.  The potential for consolidation with KKR subsidiary RBMedia was quickly noted in the library and publishing industry; the acquisition was finalized in June 2020.

In May 2020, KKR announced that it will be investing $750 million in cosmetics producer Coty, Inc. A separate plan was revealed in which several divisions of Coty are set to be spun out into a new company. According to the deal, KKR will own 60%, while Coty 40% of the new business. The same month, it was announced that KKR is set to make an investment into Indian digital company Jio Platforms. It was reported that KKR was negotiating to buy a $1.5bn stake of a maximum value reach of $65bn for Jio Platforms. In late June 2020, KKR announced it would lead a $48 million funding round for Artlist, a provider of royalty-free music, sound effects and video. Despite the COVID-19 pandemic, the company reported a profit of $16 billion in the Q2 for 2020.

In August 2020, it was reported that KKR was preparing to sell its Epicor Software Corp. branch. On August 31, it was officially confirmed that a group primary represented by private-equity firm Clayton, Dubilier & Rice is set to buy the branch in a deal worth $4.7 billion. The acquisition was one of the largest purchases of 2020. In September 2020, KKR announced an investment of $755 million in the retail arm of India-based Reliance Industries Ltd.

In November 2020, KKR teamed up with Rakuten to acquire 85% of Seiyu, the Japanese nationwide retail chain owned by Walmart.

In January 2021, KKR acquired a majority stake in the catalogue of American musician Ryan Tedder, including his band OneRepublic and the songs that he composed for other artists since 2016.

In November 2021, KKR disposed of Audiobooks.com to streaming company Storytel for $135 million; later that same month, KKR and Global Infrastructure Partners announced they would acquire CyrusOne for $15 billion.

In February 2022, it was reported by Bloomberg that Saudi Arabian Public Investment Fund had purchased just over a 5% stake in Capcom and Nexon, reportedly worth $883 USD million, while KKR acquired 8.5% of Nexon, the Japanese-South Korean video game company.

In April 2022, KKR announced the signing of an agreement to purchase Barracuda Networks from Thoma Bravo, which closed in August that year; later that same month, KKR announced it had acquired all shares of Mitsubishi UBS Realty, a Japanese real estate asset manager.

In May 2022, Business Wire reported that KKR led about $200 million investment round in Semperis, a cybersecurity company focused on identity protection. Shortly after, Crunchbase listed Semperis as a privacy & security unicorn. Although the company's valuation has not been publicly confirmed, news outlets such as SecurityWeek, Enterprise Times, and SC Media concur this funding round puts Semperis in unicorn territory.

In June 2022, it was announced that KKR would sell Cardenas to funds affiliated with Apollo Global Management for an undisclosed amount.

Partners
Over the years, many of KKR's original partners have departed, the most notable being co-founder Jerome Kohlberg. After a leave of absence due to illness in 1985, Kohlberg returned to find increasing differences in strategy with his partners, Kravis and Roberts. In 1987, Kohlberg left KKR to found a new private equity firm, Kohlberg & Company, which resumed the investment style that Kohlberg had practiced at Bear Stearns and in KKR's earlier years, acquiring smaller, middle-market companies.

Since 1996, general partners of KKR have included Henry Kravis, George R. Roberts, Paul Raether, Robert MacDonnell, Jose Gandarillas, Michael Michelson, Saul Fox, James H. Greene, Jr., Michael Tokarz, Clifton S. Robbins, Scott Stuart, Perry Golkin and Edward Gilhuly. Among those who left were Saul Fox, Ted Ammon, Ned Gilhuly, Mike Tokarz and Scott Stuart who had been instrumental in establishing KKR's reputation and track record in the 1980s. KKR remains tightly controlled by Kravis and Roberts. The issue of succession has remained an important consideration for KKR's future.
 Scott C. Nuttall (born 1972) formerly headed KKR's fastest-growing department, the Global Capital and Asset Management Group. He joined KKR in November 1996 after leaving the Blackstone Group. With the support of co-founder George Roberts, Nuttall spearheaded the campaign to transform KKR from a private equity firm into an investment firm after noting lost opportunities amounting to billions of dollars that the company had had to turn down. He also has served on the board of Fiserv (a financial services firm) since it acquired, for $22 billion, in 2019, the KKR-backed First Data Corp. Nuttall was named co-President and co-COO, with Joseph Bae, on July 17, 2017, responsible for the day-to-day operations of the firm, concentrating on KKR's corporate and real estate credit, capital markets, hedge fund and capital raising businesses together with the firm's corporate development, balance sheet, and strategic growth initiatives. The New York Times called Nuttall and Joseph Bae potential successors to the firm's founders. In 2021, he was promoted to co-CEO. He  graduated, summa cum laude, from the Wharton School of the University of Pennsylvania with a Bachelor of Science degree. 
 Joseph Bae (born 1972) joined KKR from Goldman Sachs in 1996. Most recently, he was the managing partner of KKR Asia and the global head of KKR's Infrastructure and Energy Real Asset businesses. Mr. Bae has been the architect of KKR's Asian expansion since 2005. He has been named co-president and co-chief operating officer with Scott Nuttall on July 17, 2017, to be responsible for the day-to-day operations of the firm. Bae focuses on KKR's global private equity businesses as well as the Firm's real asset platforms across energy, infrastructure, and real estate private equity. In 2021, he was promoted to co-CEO. He graduated with a Bachelor of Arts degree from Harvard College.
 Alexander Navab (1965 – 2019) joined KKR from Goldman Sachs in 1993 and was the former head of Americas Private Equity. After spending 24 years at the firm, he stepped down as part of the Nuttall-Bae transition and would retire. In September 2017, he was elected to Columbia University's board of trustees. He was born in Isfahan, Iran, but followed his family and became a refugee in Greece following the Iranian Revolution. They immigrated to the United States two years later. He received a bachelor of arts degree from Columbia College, Columbia University, and an MBA degree from Harvard Business School. In 2016, he was honored with Ellis Island Medal of Honor. He died in July 2019 at age 53.
 Saul A. Fox left KKR in 1997 to found Fox Paine & Company, a middle market private equity firm with over $1.5 billion of capital under management
 Clifton S. Robbins left KKR to join competitor General Atlantic Partners in 2000 and later founded Blue Harbour Group, a private investment firm based in Greenwich, Connecticut.
 Edward A. Gilhuly and Scott Stuart left KKR in 2004 to launch Sageview Capital. Prior to this, Gilhuly was the managing partner of KKR's London-based European operations. Stuart had managed KKR's energy and consumer products industry groups.
 Ted Ammon, started several new ventures including Big Flower Press, which printed newspaper circulars, and Chancery Lane Capital, a boutique private equity firm, before being murdered in his Long Island home October 2001. The lover of his estranged, now deceased wife, Generosa, was later convicted.
 Paul Hazen, served as chairman and CEO of Wells Fargo (1995–2001). Hazen later returned to KKR to serve as chairman of Accel-KKR, a joint venture with Accel Partners, and later as chairman of KKR's publicly listed affiliate, KFN. 
 Clive Hollick, Baron Hollick, CEO of United News and Media (1996–2005)
 Ken Mehlman joined KKR in 2008 as global head of public affairs.
 David Petraeus, selected to serve as chairman of the newly formed KKR Global Institute (2013—present)
 Joseph Grundfest, professor at Stanford Law School and youngest SEC Commissioner
 Malcolm Turnbull, former Prime Minister of Australia; commenced 1 June 2019.

Works about KKR

Notes

References

 FT.com / Industries / Basic industries – "KKR set to buy Masonite for C$3.1bn"
 Gross, Daniel & David Sterling. "Has Henry Kravis gone soft?". Slate, August 5, 2007; retrieved August 7, 2007.
 The KKR Way. Bloomberg Markets, August 2007
 "The barbarians at the gate have been losing their Midas touch". timesonline.co.uk, August 6, 2005; retrieved February 16, 2009.

External links
 

 
 
1976 establishments in New York (state)
2010 initial public offerings
American companies established in 1976
Companies listed on the New York Stock Exchange
Financial services companies based in New York City
Financial services companies established in 1976
Hedge fund firms in New York City
Investment banks in the United States
Investment companies based in New York City
Mezzanine capital investment firms
Private equity firms of the United States
Publicly traded companies based in New York City
Borden (company)